Lerema is a genus of skipper butterflies in the family Hesperiidae.

Species
Lerema accius (Smith, 1797) – clouded skipper
Lerema ancillaris (Butler, 1877)
Lerema ancus (Möschler, 1879)
Lerema caraca Mielke, 1992
Lerema duroca (Plötz, 1882)
Lerema etelka (Schaus, 1902)
Lerema geisa (Möschler, 1879)
Lerema lineosa (Herrich-Schäffer, 1865)
Lerema liris (Evans, 1955)
Lerema lucius Grishin, 2022
Lerema lumina (Herrich-Schäffer, 1869)
Lerema lyde (Godman, 1900)

Former species
Lerema coyana Schaus, 1902 - transferred to Ralis coyana (Schaus, 1902)
Lerema veadeira Mielke, 1968 - transferred to Veadda veadeira (Mielke, 1968)
Lerema viridis Bell, 1942 - transferred to Viridina viridis (Bell, 1942)

References

Hesperiinae
Hesperiidae genera